Eirik Valla Dønnem (born 21 July 1990) is a former Norwegian footballer.

Career
Valla Dønnem started his career at Rosenborg as a junior, he then moved to Byåsen in 2010. After two season in Byåsen, Valla Dønnem moved to local club Tiller in 2013. In 2014 the club was renamed Tillerbyen following a merger. 

He moved back to his former club Byåsen in 2015, he stayed in the club until he moved to first-tier Ranheim before the 2018 season.

Valla Dønnem made his debut for Ranheim in Eliteserien in a 4-1 win against Stabæk.

Career statistics

References

1990 births
Living people
Footballers from Trondheim
Norwegian footballers
Byåsen Toppfotball players
Ranheim Fotball players
Eliteserien players

Association football midfielders